A constitutional referendum was held in Mauritania and Senegal on 13 October 1946 as part of the wider French constitutional referendum. The proposed new constitution was approved by 92% of voters in the two territories and 57.4% of the overall vote. Voter turnout was 60.4%.

Results

References

1946 referendums
October 1946 events in Africa
1946 II
1946 in Mauritania
1946 II
1946 in Senegal